Golden Girl and the Guardians of the Gemstones was a line of toys manufactured by Galoob in 1984-5.

Galoob's toy line was focused on eleven 6" action figures with 5 points of articulation, bendable legs and rooted hair.  The line consisted of five female heroes, Golden Girl, Saphire, Rubee, Onyx and Jade (The Guardians of the Gemstones) - and four female villains, Dragon Queen, Vultura, Moth Lady and Wild One (The Forces of Evil).  Additionally there were two male action figures included in the line, Prince Kroma (aligned with the heroines) and Ogra (aligned with the villains).  Each figure included a cape, a comb, a diecast shield with a shiny gemstone embedded in it, a headpiece and a weapon.

An extensive fashion line was produced in conjunction with the action figure line.  3 waves were released, and each wave contained an individual fashion for each of the 9 female characters.  Each wave had a specific theme:  Evening Enchantment, a line of gowns; Festival Spirit, a line of shiny outfits; and Forest Fantasy, a line of rustic outfits.

Additional play elements were released including a castle playset for the heroines, The Palace of Gems.  Golden Girl's unicorn Olympia, and Dragon Queen's steed Shadow were also produced.  Both horses were available for purchase by themselves or in separate deluxe sets that included chariots (w/ the chariots matching each horse's color scheme).  4 Dream Tents were produced for the action figures in limited numbers.  A Collector's case to store the action figures was also released.

Galoob also licensed out play items separate from the action figure line including Find Your Own Fate books, activity books, storybooks, a sticker calendar, a stamp set, jigsaw puzzles and a board game.  Additionally, a 3-D Colorforms playset was produced that included all 11 characters.  The ethnicities of Vultura and Onyx were swapped in the Colorforms playset.

Non-playline items included a Golden Girl Halloween costume, a Thermos brand lunchbox, drinking cups and a sleeping bag.  Wearable metallic brooches representing the 5 heroines (Golden Girl, Saphire, Rubee, Onyx and Jade) were also produced.

The Story
Golden Girl, Saphire, Rubee, Onyx and Jade are the Guardians of precious jewels called Gemstones.  The Gemstones make the Guardians strong and skillful so they can defend the Kingdom of Argonia from all enemies. One of these enemies, Dragon Queen, seeks to conquer Argonia with her band of evil warriors Vultura, Moth Lady and Wild One.

The Characters

The Guardians of the Gemstones
Each member of the Guardians of the Gemstones was produced in 6" action figure form.  Each action figure had 5 points of articulation, including neck, shoulders, and hips as well as bendable legs.  All figures had rooted hair, female and male, and included a comb.  Accessories for each figure included a fabric cape, diecast metal shield, belt, weapon and headpiece.  Each diecast shield has a shiny gemstone embedded in it representing the Hero or Villain it belonged to and could also be worn by the toy owner as a brooch.  
Golden Girl - Princess of the Gemstone Guardians.  "The beautiful and strong winner of the Argonia competitions against Dragon Queen.  A gentle leader, Golden Girl, along with her able Guardians, faces constant conflict with the defeated and evil Dragon Queen.  Even with the amazing power from her Gemstone shield and the magical help from her magnificent steed, Olympia, she is always on guard against attack.  Will she always be able to protect the good people of Argonia and the precious powerful Gemstone?"  Golden girl wore a gold metallic two piece outfit.  Her cape is gold and white and her boots and wrist gauntlets are gold.  Golden Girl did not wear as much makeup as the other characters, her earrings were gold and her lipstick was pink.  Golden Girl had golden blonde hair and a gold crown.  Golden Girl's shield was in the shape of a golden bird with a white gemstone in the center of it and her weapon was a silver sword.  Golden Girl had a production variation in her cape:  she was sometimes produced with a blue and gold cape similar to Saphire's.
Saphire - Poweress of the Sea and Sky. The lovely warrior whose home is with the Sea Folk of the Cluster Isles.  Saphire has the amazing ability to communicate with the creatures of the sea and the sky.  And from them she receives a special strength to help win against the Evil Forces of the Dragon Queen".  Saphire wore a blue one-shouldered bodice with golden accents.  Her cape is blue and gold, and her boots and wrist gauntlets are dark blue with gold accents.  Saphire's eye makeup was blue and white, her earrings were blue and her lipstick was pink.  She had light blonde hair and a gold headband.  Saphire's shield white and gold, in the shape of a star with a blue gemstone in the center of it and her weapon was a bladed lance.  Saphire had a few production variations in both hair and make up:  her hair was produced in both light blonde or dark blonde, and her eye makeup had two variants (one much heavier than the other).
Rubee - Fiery Champion on the Lightning Bow. A red-headed expert archeress from the Fire Isle. Her weapons are a silver bow and flare-tipped arrows. 
Onyx - Challenger of the Sabered Sword. From the Isle of Dunes. Her weapons are throwing stones that possess amazing accuracy and returm to her hand after being throw and a saber with a serrated edge. 
Jade - Mystic of the Secret Jewels. From the Ermaline Island. She uses a broadsword and possesses mystical insights. 
Prince Kroma - Brave and Daring Hero of Battle. Occasionally joining the Guardians is Prince Kroma, whose nemesis is Ogra.

Dragon Queen's Forces of EvilEach member of the Forces of Evil was produced in 6" action figure form.  Each action figure had 5 points of articulation, including neck, shoulders, and hips as well as bendable legs.  All figures had rooted hair, female and male, and included a comb.  Accessories for each figure included a fabric cape, diecast metal shield, belt, weapon and headpiece.  Each diecast shield has a shiny gemstone embedded in it representing the Hero or Villain it belonged to and could also be worn by the toy owner as a brooch.Dragon Queen - Lives on Storm Isle after being banished from Argonia. She uses dark magic and carries a samurai sword. She rides a black horse called Shadow.
Vultura - Practices witchcraft and is armed with long, sharp claws. 
Moth Lady - Born from a cocoon, she now has wings and carries a trident. 
Wild One - Armed with knowledge of the wild, she carries a battle-axe
Ogra - Leader of another group known as the Barbarian Forces, Ogra occasionally joins Dragon Queen in fighting the Guardians.

 Unproduced Concepts 
Concept drawings of additional action figures, playsets and accessories exist.

The Guardians of the GemstonesA very small quantity of the Dymondia figure was released in Europe.  The figure appears to be a repaint of the Rubee figure rather than including any unique molding, which seems to indicate the Dymondia figures may have been prototypes that Galoob was using to sell Series 2 to retailers.  The Dymondia figure was in a new blue Series 2 box as opposed to the pink Series 1 box design.  None of the other Series 2 Guardians of the Gemstones characters are known to have been produced.  
Dymondia - Dymondia's bodice, gauntlets, skirt and boots were white with dark pink accents in a fanned shape.  Instead of a cape, she had light pink wings, similar to those of a bird (as opposed to Moth Lady's insect-like wings).  Dymondia's hair was white, and looks like it was designed to sparkle.  She wore a golden headband with a diamond at the center near her forehead.  Dymondia's diamond-shaped shield was white, dark pink and gold and contained a diamond gemstone.  Her weapon was a white and gold staff, topped by a diamond. 
Coral - Coral's bodice and boots were white, with golden shells embellished on them.  Her crown and wrist gauntlets were golden, and her crown had a golden netting that cascaded over her hair.  Coral's hair was pink.  She carried a white shield with red embellishments and a white and gold trident.
Turquoise - Turquoise's bodice was white with blue details and white flowers.  She wore a blue cape and her white boots have a tasseled fringe.  Turquoise had black hair and wears a white crown with a flower design on it, as well as white hair ties on her pigtails.  Turquoise's look seems to be inspired by a Native American motif.  She carries a white shield with a blue gemstone and a white staff. 
Pearl - Pearl's bodice, gauntlets and boots were white with embellishments of gold.  She wore a dark pink skirt and sash over her bodice, along with a short cape that was dark pink and white.  Pearl had blonde hair and wore a white butterfly shaped crown.  Pearl carried a white shield and a white staff, both with gold embellishments.

The Forces of EvilNone of the Series 2 Forces of Evil characters are known to have been produced.''
Spidra - Spidra had a webbed design on her green bodice, gauntlets and boots.  Spidra's cape was a black weblike material and a red spider spanned across her bodice.  Her eye makeup was green and white and she looked to have makeup or a tattoo on the right side of her face that spanned from her forehead down to her jawline.  Spidra had fiery red hair and wore a green jeweled crown in the shape of a spiderweb.  Her shield was green, with a red gemstone and she carried a sword. 
Centaura - Centaura was a red centaur with black hair and a beard.  His lower body was that of a horse, with a spiked tail and spiked hooves.  He was to wear a black chestplate with silver markings.  Centaura wore gauntlets, carried a shield and a black double-edged spear.

References

1980s toys